Bucculatrix argentisignella is a moth species in the family Bucculatricidae. It was first described by Gottlieb August Wilhelm Herrich-Schäffer in 1855 and is found in France and in disjunct populations in Central, Eastern and Northern Europe.

Adults exhibit sexual dimorphism. Males have uniform grey wings, lacking the four silvery spots on the forewings.

The larvae feed on Leucanthemum vulgare. They mine the leaves of their host plant. The mine starts as a narrow, upper- or lower-surface gallery. Later, the gallery widens, becoming full-depth. The frass is deposited in the center of the corridor. Larvae sometimes leave the mine and continue elsewhere. Pupation takes place outside of the mine. Larvae can be found from May to June and again in July.

References

Natural History Museum Lepidoptera generic names catalog

External links
Images representing Bucculatrix argentisignella at Consortium for the Barcode of Life

Moths described in 1855
Bucculatricidae
Taxa named by Gottlieb August Wilhelm Herrich-Schäffer
Moths of Europe
Leaf miners